Ackah is a surname. Notable people with the surname include:

 Bernard Ackah (born 1972), Ivorian mixed martial artist and comedian
 Jewel Ackah ( 1945–2018), Ghanaian musician
 Lovelace Ackah (born 1976), Ghanaian footballer
 Yaw Ackah (born 1999), Ghanaian footballer

Surnames of African origin